Shahe fen (沙河粉), or simply he fen (河粉), is a type of wide Chinese noodle made from rice. Its Minnan Chinese name, translated from the Mandarin 粿條 (guotiao), is adapted into alternate names which are widely encountered in Southeast Asia, such as kway teow, kwetiau, and kuetiau. Shahe fen is often stir fried with meat and/or vegetables in a dish called chao fen (炒粉; pinyin: chǎo fěn). While chao fen is a transliteration of Mandarin, chow fun from Cantonese (see the main article at beef chow fun) is the name most often given to the dish in Chinese restaurants in North America.

Names

While shahe fen and he fen are transliterations based on Mandarin, there are numerous other transliterations based on Cantonese, which include ho fun, hofoen (a Dutch transliteration in Suriname), hor fun,  sar hor fun, etc. In addition, shahe fen is often synonymously called kway teow, literally "ricecake strips", transliteration based on Minnan Chinese, POJ: kóe-tiâu) or in Mandarin, guotiao (Mandarin pinyin: guǒtiáo), as in the name of a dish called char kway teow. 

However, shahe fen and kway teow are strictly and technically not the same (the latter being essentially ricecakes sliced into strips) and the Minnan people in general still consciously make a distinction between shahe fen and guotiao/kway teow in their speech. Hor fun was perfected by the Cantonese and is thin and tapered like strips of tape, with some porous areas that absorb the gravy, taste, and flavour of the broth or sauce that it is cooked in because it contains less starchy content, which has been stripped away during the production process. In contrast, guotiao/kuay teow is dense, and less absorbent and contains a higher level of starch and is more impermeable to absorbing flavours, and thus has to be soaked for a longer period of time in the dish preparation usually for a day or more, or is soaked in water first for a long time before it is fried as char kway teow. The taste, texture, flavour, ingredients, length, thickness, width, style, density are very different for Chinese and Asian palates, but most foreigners may not be able to tell the difference immediately. 

Guotiao/kway teow has a different origin from shahe fen , from Northeast instead of Central China, and is a modification of the guo/kway (ricecake) production process, and originated as the ancient preservation of rice as a starch-filled cake patty (of which Korean rice strips are yet another descendant, as it was brought as a recipe from China to Choseon dynasty when the Emperor of China during the Ming dynasty took the Korean princess as one of his concubines, and this recipe was gifted to the people of Choseon as a betrothal gift to the Korean people). In Hokkien (Fujian) of China, this version of guotiao/kway teow was then influenced by the Cantonese shahe fen from the neighboring province of Guangdong. Cantonese culture from the 17th century onwards was thought of as the dominant culture of civilization and culture, of wealth, excess, and sophistication, so the ancient guotiao/kway teow underwent modification to become similar to the standard Cantonese shahe fen/hor fun. However, these two versions (guotiao/kway teow vs. shahe fen/hor fun) were spread to Southeast Asia and the world differently, thus they are presented differently in different dishes. Good Chinese restaurants do not mix up or confuse the two, but more casual versions of Chinese takeout often use the two interchangeably. Original ricecakes and its strips (i.e. authentic guotiao/kway teow) are stiff in texture, even after cooking, making them unpopular with modern consumers. 

Another similar noodle confused by Westerners is the nee tai mak which is like the hor fun and the bee hoon combined with Milanese pasta.

It is also known in Sabah as da fen, means "wide vermicelli", due to its similarity of colour and texture to rice vermicelli.

These noodles are called guay tiew sen yai (meaning "large rice noodles") in Thailand, kwetiau in Indonesia and pho in Vietnam as its counterpart version.

Origin

Shahe fen is believed to have originated in the town of Shahe, now part of the Tianhe District in the city of Guangzhou, in the southern Chinese province of Guangdong, whence their name derives.  Shahe fen is typical of southern Chinese cuisine, although similar noodles are also prepared and enjoyed in nearby Southeast Asian nations such as Vietnam, Thailand, Cambodia, Philippines, Malaysia, Indonesia and Singapore, all of which have sizeable Chinese populations.

Types

Shahe fen noodles are white in color, broad, and somewhat slippery. Their texture is elastic and a bit chewy.  They do not freeze or dry well and are thus generally (where available) purchased fresh, in strips or sheets that may be cut to the desired width. Where fresh noodles are not available, they may also be purchased packaged in dried form, in various widths.

Shahe fen noodles are very similar to Vietnamese bánh phở noodles, which are likely derived from their Chinese counterpart. Although the phở noodles used in soups may vary in width, wide phở noodles are also common in stir fried dishes. The popular Thai dishes phat si-io and drunken noodles are also made with similar noodles.

Chao fen

Shahe fen is often stir-fried with meat and vegetables in a dish called chao fen (炒粉; pinyin: chǎo fěn). While chao fen is a transliteration of Mandarin, chow fun, from Cantonese, is the name to which this dish is most often referred in Chinese restaurants in North America.

See also

Gallery

References

External links
 

Cantonese cuisine
Chinese noodles
Hong Kong cuisine
Singaporean cuisine